Brieselang station is a railway station in the municipality of Brieselang, located in the Havelland district in Brandenburg, Germany.

References

Railway stations in Brandenburg
Buildings and structures in Havelland (district)